Simon Kernick (born February 1967 in Slough, Buckinghamshire) is a British thriller/crime writer now living in Oxfordshire with his two daughters.
Kernick attended Gillotts School, a comprehensive in Henley-on-Thames, Oxfordshire.   Whilst he was a student his jobs included fruit-picker and Christmas-tree uprooter.  He graduated from Brighton Polytechnic in 1991 with a degree in humanities. 

Kernick had a passion for crime fiction writing from a young age and produced many short stories during his time at polytechnic. After graduating Kernick joined MMT Computing in London in early 1992, where a relative was the Chairman and Managing Director. He left the company after four years in the hope of trying to secure a publishing deal. Despite interest from a number of publishers Kernick was unable to secure a deal, so he joined the sales force of the specialist IT and Business Consultancy Metaskil plc in Aldermaston, Berkshire in 1998 where he remained until he secured his first book deal The Business of Dying in September 2001.

His novel Relentless was recommended on Richard & Judy's Summer book club 2007. It was the 8th best-selling paperback, and the best-selling thriller in the UK in the same year.

Awards

Bibliography
The Business of Dying (Dennis Milne 1) (2002) — (Bantam)
The Murder Exchange (2003) — (Bantam)
The Crime Trade (Tina Boyd 1) (2004) — (Bantam)
A Good Day To Die (Dennis Milne 2) (2005) — (Bantam)     
Relentless (Tina Boyd 2, Mike Bolt 1) (2006) — (Bantam)Severed (Mike Bolt 2) (2007) — (Bantam)Deadline (Tina Boyd 3) (2008)Target (Tina Boyd 4, Mike Bolt 3) (2009)The Last 10 Seconds (Tina Boyd 5, Mike Bolt 4) (2010)The Payback (Dennis Milne 3, Tina Boyd 6) (2011)Siege(Scope 1, plus Tina Boyd) (2012)
Wrong Time, Wrong Place (2013, February)
Ultimatum (Tina Boyd 7, Mike Bolt 5) (2013, June)
Stay Alive (Mike Bolt 6, Scope 2) (2014) 
The Final Minute (Tina Boyd 8) (2015, January)
The Witness (DI Ray Mason 1) (2016, January)
The Bone Field (DI Ray Mason 2, Tina Boyd 9) (2017, January)
The Hanged Man (DI Ray Mason 3, Tina Boyd 10) (2018, January)
Dead Mans Gift & Other Stories (2018, July)
We Can See You (2018, November)
Die Alone (DI Ray Mason 4, Tina Boyd 11, Mike Bolt 7) (2019, November)
Kill A Stranger (2020)
Good Cop Bad Cop (2021)

References

External links

Simon Kernick bibliography on Internet Book List

English crime fiction writers
Alumni of the University of Brighton
People from Slough
1966 births
Living people
People from Oxfordshire
21st-century British novelists
English male novelists